Brukina, also known as Burkina, is a Ghanaian drink or beverage made of ground millet and pasteurized milk. Brukina is most popularly produced in the Northern regions of Ghana. It is also known as 'Deger'.

Overview 
Brukina is considered to be a complete meal due to its energy density and high nutrient content. It consists mainly of millet, which is one of the world's oldest grains, and milk.

Preparation 

Brukina is prepared using millet, fresh cow milk or milk powder, salt, water and sugar. To prepare Brukina:
 Wash the millet and soak overnight
 The next morning, drain the water and grind the millet to a rough texture
 Boil water
 Fetch the millet into a sieve and use your hands to roll it until you are able to form tiny balls
 When the water is hot, pour the tiny balls of millet into a colander and cover with lid
 Cover the colander tightly and allow steam from the hot water to soften it
 When the tiny balls become soft and cooked, pour into basin and allow to cool
 Mix with fresh cow milk or milk powder and water and mix
 Add a little sugar to taste
 Refrigerate and serve.

Health Benefits 
Millet in Brukina contains magnesium, manganese, calcium, phosphorus, Vitamin B etc.

The milk contains Vitamin D and Calcium.

References

External links
 Video how to prepare Brukina

Ghanaian cuisine
African drinks